A Mahamatra (meaning "Officer of high rank") was an "officer of morality" established by the Indian Emperor Ashoka (reigned 269-233 BCE). Their full title was Dhaṃma Mahāmātā, the "Inspectors of the Dharma". They were apparently a class of senior officials who were in charge various aspects of administration and justice.

The Mahamatras are mentioned in several of the Edicts of Ashoka, inscribed on rocks or pillars. They seem to have been an essential part of his government.

Some were called "Dharma-Mahamatras" ("Mahamatras of Virtue"), who seem to have been established in the 14th year of Ashoka's reign (256 BCE). There were also Amta-mahamatras in charge of foreigners, and Stri-adhyaksha- mahamatras, in charge of women.

References

Indian inscriptions
Linguistic history of India
Edicts of Ashoka